The 2019–20 Hong Kong Sapling Cup was the 5th edition of the Hong Kong Sapling Cup, and was the second time in history without name sponsorship. The Cup was contested by the 10 teams in the 2019–20 Hong Kong Premier League. The objective of the Cup was to create more potential playing opportunities for youth players. Each team were required to field a minimum of three players born on or after 1 January 1998 (U-22) and a maximum of six foreign players during every whole match, with no more than four foreign players on the pitch at the same time. 

Lee Man were the defending champions, but were eliminated after failing to progress further from group stage. Kitchee became the champions for the second time after beating Southern in the final.

Calendar

Group stage

Group A

Group B

Final
The final will take place on 27 September 2020 at Tseung Kwan O Sports Ground.

Top scorers

Remarks

References

2019–20 domestic association football cups
Sapling Cup
Hong Kong Sapling Cup